Chengbei is a township of Zhaojue County in the north-central part of the Liangshan Yi Autonomous Prefecture in southern Sichuan province, China, located about  northeast of the county seat. , it has 6 villages under its administration.

See also 
 List of township-level divisions of Sichuan

References 

Township-level divisions of Sichuan
Zhaojue County